Ablaincourt-Pressoir is a commune in the Somme department in Hauts-de-France in northern France.

The two villages were formerly separately administered, but were joined in 1966.

Geography
Ablaincourt-Pressoir is found in the Santerre sub-region, where early French Kings made their base, at Noyon.
The town is in a strategic position close to the intersections of the A1 Paris-Lille autoroute and the A29 autoroute between Amiens and Saint-Quentin. Two departmental roads meet nearby (the D150 and the D164).
The town also an international TGV rail station, the Gare TGV Haute-Picardie, nicknamed "The sugar-beet station" named after the predominant crop of the area.

Etymology; Ancient forms of the names
 Ablaincourt
Abatix Curtis, Habelini Curtis (1046), Ablani Curtis, Ableni Curia (1106), Abbecourt (1144), Abiaucourt (1215), Ablaincort (1230), Ablincourt (1733) and finally, Ablaincourt, which signifies an abbey.
 Pressoir
Pressurs or Drêsur (1180).

History
 Ablaincourt
In 1215, Jean I de Nesle built a castle here. Remains of the motte can still be seen, which marks out the position of the keep.

In 1648, possession of the fiefdom of Ablaincourt passed from the Blattepière family to the Mathieu family.

During World War I Ablaincourt et Pressoir were at the centre of the Battle of the Somme. Both communes were totally ruined by the fighting.

Demographics

Data before 1966 in the table and graph below refer to the old commune Ablaincourt, before the merger with Pressoir. The population of Pressoir was 144 in 1851, 106 in 1896 and 64 in 1962.

People
 Eloi Driencourt, born in the hamlet of Bovent, Ablaincourt, doctor of the Sorbonne and for a while, advisor to Louis XV's queen, Maria Leszczyńska (1703–1768).
 Ludovic Hulin was elected in March 1995 and became the youngest mayor of Ablaincourt-Pressoir, at the age of 28.
 Reinhard Johannes Sorge, a German Roman Catholic poet and dramatist, died at a First Aid post located at the ruins of Ablaincourt-Pressoir on 20 July 1916. Sorge had been wounded by a hand grenade during the Battle of the Somme.

See also
Communes of the Somme department

References

Communes of Somme (department)